Vistrorio is a comune (municipality) in the Metropolitan City of Turin in the Italian region Piedmont, located about  north of Turin.

Vistrorio borders the following municipalities: Rueglio, Issiglio, Castelnuovo Nigra, Vidracco, Quagliuzzo, Strambinello, Baldissero Canavese and Val di Chy.

References

Cities and towns in Piedmont